Exerodonta catracha is a species of frog in the family Hylidae.
It is endemic to Honduras.
Its natural habitats are subtropical or tropical moist montane forests, rivers, and freshwater marshes.
It is threatened by habitat loss.

References

C
Endemic fauna of Honduras
Amphibians of Honduras
Endangered fauna of North America
Amphibians described in 1987
Taxonomy articles created by Polbot